Gabriela Aguilar García (born 15 September 1973) is a Mexican politician affiliated with the Ecologist Green Party of Mexico.

From 2006 to 2009, she served as a member of the Senate of the Republic in the LXI Legislature of the Mexican Congress, representing the Federal District.

See also

 List of Mexicans

References

1973 births
Ecologist Green Party of Mexico politicians
Living people
Women members of the Senate of the Republic (Mexico)
Members of the Senate of the Republic (Mexico) for Mexico City
Politicians from Mexico City
21st-century Mexican women politicians
20th-century Mexican politicians
21st-century Mexican politicians
20th-century Mexican women politicians
Universidad del Valle de México alumni